Boutique hotels are small-inventory, design-driven, unique hotels with their own character, personality and storytelling at the heart of their concept. Positioning is secondary for these hotels as they focus on authenticity and personalization. They capitalize on the desire for rich experiences by incorporating elements such as nature and environment, cuisine, history, local culture and community, service and wellness.

History
Boutique hotels began appearing in the 1980s in major cities like London, New York, and San Francisco. Two of the first opened in 1981: Blakes Hotel in South Kensington, London (designed by Anouska Hempel) and the Bedford in Union Square, San Francisco (the first in a series of 34 boutique hotels currently operated by the Kimpton Group). Although there is some debate as to whether it was the first boutique hotel, Morgans, founded by Ian Schrager and Steve Rubell in New York City, is the most notable of the era; it debuted in 1984. San Francisco & Los Angeles boutique hoteliers, Paul Ruffino, Charles Mosser & Chip Connely were engaged in what was an East Coast/West Coast debate over who coined the phrase. Many have laid claim.

International hotel chains later began to establish luxury boutique sub-brands to capitalize on the growth of this sector. Recently, major hotel chains have started to introduce soft brands; soft brand association allows independent hotel owners to benefit from their expertise, brand recall and distribution muscle while retaining the concept, character and design of the hotel.

Description
Many boutique hotels are furnished in a themed, stylish and/or aspirational manner with distinctive concepts, often reflecting the local culture and neighbourhoods to which the hotels reside in. The popularity of the boutique concept has prompted some multi-national hotel companies to try to capture a market share.  In the United States, New York City remains an important centre for boutique hotels clustered about Manhattan. Some members of the hospitality industry are following the general "no-frill chic" consumer trend, with affordable or budget boutique hotels being created all around the world. Boutique hotels are found in London, New York City, Miami, New Orleans and Los Angeles. They are also found in resort destinations with exotic amenities such as electronics, spas, yoga and painting classes.

References

 
Hotel types